The 2017 Curaçao Sekshon Pagá was the 91st season of top-flight association football in Curaçao, and the 40th season of the competition being branded as the Sekshon Pagá. The season started on 5 February and concluded on 17 September 2017.

Regular season

Kaya 6

Kaya 4

Final

References

2017
1
1